The first Morgan government was formed on 16 October 2000 by Rhodri Morgan and a was a coalition government with the Liberal Democrats, it was officially referred to as the 'Coalition Partnership' . It was proceeded by the Interim Morgan Government, a Labour minority government headed by Rhodri Morgan between February and October 2000.

Background
Rhodri Morgan became First Secretary of Wales on 15 February 2000, between February and October 2000 and headed up a minority government with 28 of the Assembly's 60 seats. The unstable nature of the then minority government was of concern and was always viewed as temporary and Labour had mooted looking for a coalition partner following their persevered poor showing in the 1999 election.

Developments quickly occurred during the autumn of 2000 culminating in Tom Middlehurst resigning as Secretary for post-16 education on 9 October claiming he could not “contemplate sitting down at the Cabinet table with the Liberal Democrats”.

The six Liberal Democrat seats was an attractive offer to Labour and following a special conference by both parties a coalition was agreed upon.
 
A new coalition government (officially referred to as the Coalition Partnership) was officially announced on 5 October 2000 with policy details emerging the day later. Cabinet Ministers were then appointed on 16 October and Deputies on 17 October. That government lasted until the 2003 election.

Cabinet 

Changes: 
Andrew Davies, Minister for Economic Development and Transport from 2002.
Carwyn Jones, Minister for Assembly Business from 2002-03 in addition to the agriculture portfolio.
Jenny Randerson, Acting Deputy First Minister from July 2001 to June 2002 in addition to the culture portfolio.
Michael German, Deputy First Minister and Minister for Rural Affairs and Wales Abroad June 2002 to May 2003.

Junior ministers 

Deputy Ministers prior to the enactment of the Government of Wales Act 2006 (enactment and legal separation takes place on appointment of the First Minister, post-May 2007) are not officially part of the Government, and not in Cabinet.  From May 2007, Deputy Welsh Ministers are part of the Welsh Assembly Government, but not in Cabinet.

References

Welsh governments
Ministries of Elizabeth II